The 2014 Clásica de Almería was the 29th edition of the Clásica de Almería cycle race and was held on 2 March 2014. The race started in Almería and finished in Roquetas de Mar. The race was won by Sam Bennett.

General classification

References

2014
2014 in road cycling
2014 in Spanish sport